Marc Lowell Andreessen (born July 9, 1971) is an American entrepreneur, venture capital investor, and software engineer. He is the co-author of Mosaic, the first web browser on graphical user interface; co-founder of Netscape; and co-founder and general partner of Silicon Valley venture capital firm Andreessen Horowitz. He co-founded and later sold the software company Opsware to Hewlett-Packard. Andreessen is also a co-founder of Ning, a company that provides a platform for social networking websites.  He sits on the board of directors of Meta Platforms. Andreessen was one of six inductees in the World Wide Web Hall of Fame announced at the First International Conference on the World-Wide Web in 1994. As of February 2023, his net-worth is estimated at $1.7 billion by Forbes.

Early life and education 
Andreessen was born in Cedar Falls, Iowa, and raised in New Lisbon, Wisconsin. He is the son of Patricia and Lowell Andreessen, who worked for a seed company. In December 1993, he received his bachelor's degree in computer science from the University of Illinois at Urbana–Champaign (UIUC).  As an undergraduate, he interned twice at IBM in Austin, Texas. He worked in the AIX graphics software development group responsible for the MIT X Window implementation and ports of the 3D language APIs:  SGI's Graphics Language (GL) and PHIGS.  He also worked at the National Center for Supercomputing Applications (NCSA) at the University of Illinois, where he became familiar with Tim Berners-Lee's open standards for the World Wide Web.  After being shown the ViolaWWW graphic web browser in late 1992, Andreessen and full-time salaried co-worker Eric Bina worked on creating a browser with integrated graphics that could be ported to a wide range of computers, including Windows. The result was the Mosaic web browser released in 1993.

Career
During his career, Andreesen has worked at Netscape, Opsware, founded Andreessen Horowitz and invested in many successful companies including, Facebook, Foursquare, GitHub, Pinterest, LinkedIn and Twitter.

Netscape 

After his graduation from UIUC in 1993, Andreessen moved to California to work at Enterprise Integration Technologies. Andreessen then met with Jim Clark, the founder of Silicon Graphics, who had recently exited the firm.  Clark believed the Mosaic browser had great commercial possibilities and suggested starting an Internet software company.  Soon, Mosaic Communications Corporation was in business in Mountain View, California, with Andreessen as co-founder and vice president of technology. The University of Illinois was unhappy with the company's use of the Mosaic name, so Mosaic Communications changed its name to Netscape Communications, and its flagship Web browser was the Netscape Navigator.

Netscape's IPO in 1995 put Andreessen into the public eye. He was featured on the cover of Time and other publications.

Netscape was acquired in 1999 for $4.3 billion by AOL. Andreessen's hiring as its chief technology officer was contingent on the completion of the acquisition. The same year, he was named to the MIT Technology Review TR100 as one of the top 100 innovators in the world under the age of 35.

Opsware 

After AOL acquired Netscape in late 1998, Andreessen went on to found Opsware with Ben Horowitz, Tim Howes, and In Sik Rhee. Originally named Loudcloud, the company provided computing, hosting and software services to consumer facing internet and e-commerce companies. Loudcloud sold its hosting business to EDS and changed its name to Opsware in 2003, with Andreessen serving as chairman. Acquired by Hewlett-Packard for $1.6 billion in 2007, it was one of the first companies to offer software as a service and to attempt cloud hosting.

Andreessen Horowitz

Between 2005 and 2009, Andreessen and longtime business partner Ben Horowitz separately invested a total of $80 million in 45 start-ups that included Twitter and Qik.  The two became well known as super angel investors. On July 6, 2009, Andreessen and Horowitz announced their Silicon Valley venture-capital firm Andreessen Horowitz.

The firm had been scrutinized among several other venture capital firms for lack of diversity in its workforce. In an interview with New York Magazine, Andreessen stated the diversity discussion was valid, however, he believed the firm, as well as other venture capital firms of Silicon Valley, had been wrongly accused of intentionally discriminating against women and people of color. When asked specifically about the critique of ethnic and gender diversity in Silicon Valley, Andreessen responded that the issues were the "same thing."

Investments 
Begun with an initial capitalization of $300 million, within three years the firm grew to $2.7 billion under management across three funds. Andreessen Horowitz's portfolio holdings include Facebook, Foursquare, GitHub, Pinterest, Twitter, and Honor, Inc.

On September 1, 2009, an investor group that included Andreessen Horowitz acquired a majority stake in Skype at a valuation of $2.75 billion, which was considered risky. The deal paid off in May 2011 when Microsoft bought Skype for $8.5 billion. In 2010, the firm assisted Silicon Valley attorney Ted Wang in creating the first free standardized seed round financing documents, the Series Seed Documents.

Andreessen first joined the eBay board of directors in 2008, and served on it for six years. In October 2014, Andreessen announced his resignation from the board due to the company's decision to break off its online payments unit PayPal. The decision to cut ties with PayPal was a point of contention between Andreessen and investor Carl Icahn. Icahn advocated for the PayPal split while Andreessen opposed the spin off, resulting in public disputes. Andreessen was accused by Icahn of putting his own interests in front of what was best for shareholders. Icahn published his argument in an open letter that detailed alleged conflicts of interest in eBay's 2009 sale of Skype to a group of private investors, which included Andreessen's own firm.

Industry influence
Andreessen advises the leaders of companies in which Andreessen Horowitz invests, including Mark Zuckerberg of Facebook and Mark Pincus of Zynga.

Andreessen and Horowitz were ranked No. 6 on Vanity Fairs 2011 New Establishment List, no. 1 on CNET's 2011 most influential investors list and Nos. 2 and 21, respectively, on the 2012 Forbes Midas List of Tech's Top Investors.

In April 2012, Andreessen and Andreessen Horowitz General Partners Ben Horowitz, Peter Levine, Jeff Jordan, John O'Farrell, and Scott Weiss pledged to donate half of their lifetime incomes from venture capital to charitable organizations.

In 2012, Andreessen was named in the Time 100, an annual list of the 100 most influential people in the world assembled by Time. His essay "Software is eating the world" has been influential and highly cited.

In 2013, Andreessen was one of five Internet and Web pioneers awarded the inaugural Queen Elizabeth Prize for Engineering.

In April 2020, early in the COVID-19 pandemic, Andreessen published an opinion article, "It's time to build", describing the United States' COVID-19 response and suggesting technological and cultural solutions to the problem.

Ventures 
Andreessen cofounded and chaired Ning, the third company he established after Netscape and Loudcloud. In September 2011, it was announced that Ning had been sold to Mode Media for a reported price of $150 million. Andreessen joined Glam Media's board of directors following the sale.

He is a personal investor in companies including LinkedIn and boutique bank Raine.

Andreessen serves on the board of Facebook, Hewlett Packard Enterprise, Kno, Stanford Hospital, Bump Technologies, Anki, Oculus VR, OpenGov, Dialpad, and TinyCo. Hewlett Packard Enterprise announced in February 2018 that board member Andreessen would not seek reelection at the 2018 Annual Meeting of Stockholders on April 4. In his time at Hewlett Packard, Andreessen had been partially blamed for some of the company's failures, including the recruiting of Leo Apotheker as well as the acquisitions of Autonomy and Palm.

He is advisor to Asana and director of CollabNet. He is a proponent of Bitcoin and cryptocurrency. Andreessen is on an advisory board for Neom, the Saudi Arabian government's plan to build a futuristic megacity in the desert.

Criticism 

In February 2016, Andreessen posted a tweet in response to India's decision to apply net neutrality to Facebook's proposed project Free Basics. The tweet suggested that anti-colonialism had been catastrophic for the Indian people. Andreessen later deleted the tweet following criticism from Indians and non-Indians alike (including Facebook founder Mark Zuckerberg). Facebook spent millions advertising Free Basics to the Indian public. The project failed due to violations, setting preferential tariffs in accessing content and setting up a "walled garden" on the internet.

Conflict of interest 
In April 2016, Facebook shareholders filed a class action lawsuit to block Zuckerberg's plan to create a new class of non-voting shares. The lawsuit alleges Andreessen secretly coached Zuckerberg through a process to win board approval for the stock change, while Andreessen served as an independent board member representing stockholders.

According to court documents, Andreessen shared information with Zuckerberg regarding their progress and concerns as well as helping Zuckerberg negotiate against shareholders. Court documents included transcripts of private texts between Zuckerberg and Andreessen.

Personal life 
Andreessen married Laura Arrillaga in 2006. She is the founder of the Silicon Valley Social Venture Fund and daughter of Silicon Valley real estate billionaire John Arrillaga. They have one son together.

In 2012, Andreessen expressed some support for Republican candidate Mitt Romney. During the 2016 primary season, he endorsed Republican candidate Carly Fiorina, but after Fiorina dropped out of the race, Andreessen switched his endorsement to the Democratic nominee Hillary Clinton, citing the Republican nominee Donald Trump's immigration stance.

In 2021, he and his wife bought a property in Malibu for $177 million from Serge and Florence Azria. This was the highest price paid for a California property at that time.  

In 2022, Andreessen advocated against the construction of 131 multifamily housing units in their affluent Atherton, California town. In a letter, Andreessen and his wife wrote that they opposed permitting more than one house on a single acre of land. Andreessen's comments sparked criticisms of hypocrisy, as he had previously argued for increased housing supply, in particular in California.

Andreessen has a chapter in Tim Ferriss' book Tools of Titans.

References

External links 
 
 

1971 births
American computer programmers
American financial company founders
American technology company founders
American venture capitalists
Andreessen Horowitz
AOL employees
Arrillaga family
California Republicans
Directors of Facebook
Grainger College of Engineering alumni
Internet pioneers
Living people
Netscape people
People from Cedar Falls, Iowa
People from New Lisbon, Wisconsin
Silicon Valley people
American billionaires
Midas List